Maurice Capovila (16 January 1936 – 29 May 2021) was a Brazilian film director and screenwriter. He directed eight films between 1968 and 2003. His 1970 film The Prophet of Hunger was entered into the 20th Berlin International Film Festival.

Filmography

Director
 Brasil Verdade (1968)
 Bebel, Garota Propaganda (1968)
 The Prophet of Hunger (1970)
 Noites de Iemanjá (1971)
 Vozes do Medo (1972)
 The Night of the Scarecrow (1974)
 O Jogo da Vida (1977)
 O Boi Misterioso e o Vaqueiro Menino (1980)
 Harmada (2003)

Actor
The Red Light Bandit (1968) - Gangster
O Ritual dos Sádicos (1970)
Audácia (1970) - (final film role)

References

External links

1936 births
2021 deaths
People from Valinhos
Brazilian film directors
Brazilian screenwriters